The Orphans is a barbershop quartet that won the 1954 SPEBSQSA international competition.

References
 AIC entry (archived)

Barbershop quartets
Barbershop Harmony Society